Saugeen Tract Agreement, registered as Crown Treaty Number 45, was signed August 9, 1836 between the Saugeen Ojibwa and Ottawa and the government of Upper Canada. Conducted on the Manitoulin Island, Sir Francis Bond Head used this occasion for the provincial government's annual distribution of gifts to the Ojibwa and Ottawa of the Saugeen Peninsula (Bruce Peninsula) to negotiate the treaty.  In exchange for 1.5 million acres (6,070 km²) of land, the Ojibwa and Ottawa of Saugeen received only a promise to assist and protect Indians who took up residence on the Bruce Peninsula.

References
 
 
 

First Nations history in Ontario
Manitoulin Island
Treaties of Indigenous peoples in Canada
Treaties of Upper Canada
1836 treaties
1836 in Upper Canada
August 1836 events
History of Bruce County
Saugeen First Nation
History of the Great Lakes